The symmetron is a hypothesized elementary particle that mediates a fifth force in particle physics. It emerged as one potential solution to the symmetron field, a hypothesizedscalar field.

References

Hypothetical elementary particles
Bosons
Subatomic particles with spin 0
Force carriers